Sir Wilfrid Laurier Secondary School is a public school of the Ottawa-Carleton District School Board located in the neighbourhood of Fallingbrook, within the suburb of Orleans, in Ottawa Ontario, Canada. The school's principal is Nancy Girozan. Acting as a community hub, the school is connected to the Ray Friel Recreational Complex, the Cumberland branch of the Ottawa Public Library, a branch of the Eastern Ottawa Resource Centre, and the River Heights Children Centre.

The school's motto is "We Strive for the Highest" and its mission statement includes respect for self, respect for others, and respect for property and the environment.

As of 2016, 960 students attended Sir Wilfrid Laurier Secondary School. 51 percent of the 2016 graduating class was accepted to university, 25 percent was accepted into college institution, 24 percent went directly into the workforce, and 48 percent of all the graduating class were Ontario Scholars, thus offered some form of scholarship. Presently, the school employees 85 staff members.

Each school day consists of four seventy-five minute periods. The school hosts a number of special academic opportunities for students, such as a co-operative education program, Specialist High Skills Major (SHSM) programs, and dual course programs with Algonquin College. The school also offers special education for students who require additional support. This includes in-class IEPs, as well as specially trained educators.

History
Sir Wilfrid Laurier was originally located on Carsons Road in the east end of the City of Ottawa.  The original students came primarily from the Carson Road and Pineview neighbourhoods. During the 1980s and early 90s, students from Fallingbrook in Orleans were bussed to the school. Eventually, the entire school was home to students bussed from Orleans while a new campus was built at its current location on Tenth Line Road. After moving to the new location, students from Pineview/Carson Road attended Gloucester High School and the building was eventually purchased by the French Catholic school board as the new home for Collège Catholique Samuel-Genest.

School layout 
Sir Wilfrid Laurier is a two-story school. It includes a full resource library, and number of computer labs which hosts classes and individual work. The gym can be split into three divisions, creating space to host multiple activities or host larger sports games. Close to the gymnasium is a fitness room which includes treadmills, bench press equipment, and a variety of exercise machines. There is also a track at the back of the school and an outdoor basketball court. With the connection to the Ray Friel Recreational Complex, gym classes are able to access the swimming pool, skating rink, and public library. The school also has a broadcasting lab which is used for its broadcasting program.

Extra-curricular activities 
The school participates in a wide range of sports for both males and females. The fall sports include: golf, football, cross-country running, basketball (girls), soccer, volleyball (boys), tennis, ultimate frisbee, and rugby (7's). Winter sports include: badminton, basketball (boys), hockey, cross-country skiing, curling, ski/snowboarding, volleyball (girls), and swimming. Sports that occur in the spring season include: rugby, touch football, track and field, baseball, and soft ball. The faculty has a two-sport policy in place, meaning that a single student cannot participate in more than two sports at a time and must seek agreement on practice schedule from coaches of both sports.

Notable alumni 
 Melinda Shankar – Actress on Degrassi, and How to be Indie and other films and shows 
 Richard Adu-Bobie – A sprinter for team Canada winning a silver medal in the Pan American games as well as being an alternate athlete in the 2004 and 2008 summer olympics
 Mark Seale – Professional Canadian football player
 Ibrahim "Obby" Khan – Professional Canadian football player
 Momin Khawaja – First person charged and found guilty under the Canadian Anti-Terrorism Act
 Alex Lacasse – Canadian singer and songwriter
 Brendan Gillanders – Canadian football fullback for the Ottawa Redblacks of the Canadian Football League
Jackson Bennett - Canadian football running back for the Ottawa Redblacks of the Canadian Football League
Kurleigh Gittens Jr. - Canadian football wide receiver for the Toronto Argonauts of the Canadian Football League

See also
List of high schools in Ontario

References

External links 
School Website
OCDSB Website
2009–2010 OCDSB School Profile
2013–2014 OCDSB School Profile

High schools in Ottawa
Educational institutions in Canada with year of establishment missing